The Voice Kids is a British television music competition to find new singing talent. The fifth series began airing on 27 December 2021, on ITV. The series was confirmed by ITV and applications opened in August 2020. Emma Willis returns to present the series. Danny Jones, Pixie Lott and will.i.am return as coaches, whilst, on 7 February 2021, it was announced that Melanie C would replace Paloma Faith as a coach, who left after one series due to her pregnancy. Filming for the blind auditions began on 13 February 2021, whilst the final was pre-recorded on 13 March 2021, for which public voting was limited to fans in the auditorium. It was announced that the series would contain three episodes – two blind auditions and the final – aired over three consecutive nights, with the show concluding on 29 December. 

Torrin Cuthill won the competition, marking Melanie C's first and only win as a coach. For the first time in the show's history, Christmas songs were included.

Teams
Colour key:
  Winner
  Finalist
  Eliminated in the Battles

Blind auditions

Episode 1 (27 December)

Episode 2 (28 December)

Show details

Results summary
Team's colour key
 Team Will
 Team Melanie C
 Team Pixie
 Team Danny

Result's colour key
 Artist received the most public votes
 Finalist
 Artist was eliminated

Final (29 December)

Battles round

Grand Final

References

Voice Kids (British series 5)
2021 British television seasons